Blooming Grove is an unincorporated community in Blooming Grove Township, Franklin County, Indiana.

History
Blooming Grove was platted in 1816. The community took its name from Blooming Grove Township. A post office was established at Blooming Grove in 1832, and remained in operation until it was discontinued in 1906.

References

Unincorporated communities in Franklin County, Indiana
Unincorporated communities in Indiana